Iris Johansen (born April 7, 1938) is an American author of crime fiction, suspense fiction, and romance novels.

Biography
Iris Johansen left a job as an airline reservations agent in the early 1980s to begin writing romance novels. She changed direction slightly and began writing historical romantic suspense novels in 1991 with the publication of The Wind Dancer. She settled in to suspense writing as her main genre with the crime fiction thriller Ugly Duckling, published in 1996   and soon after became a New York Times bestselling author. Johansen was born in St Louis Missouri, lives in Georgia, and is married. Her son, Roy Johansen, is an Edgar Award-winning screenwriter and novelist. Her daughter, Tamara, contributes as her research assistant.

Bibliography

A complete list of the works by Iris Johansen

Contemporary Romance Novels 
 Stormy Vows (1983)
 Tempest At Sea (1983)
 Reluctant Lark (1983)
 The Bronzed Hawk (1983)
 The Lady and the Unicorn (1984)
 Return to Santa Flores (1984)
 No Red Roses (1984)
 White Satin (1985)
 Blue Velvet (1985)
 The Forever Dream (December, 1985)
 The Spellbinder (Louis Benoit) (1987)
 Strong, Hot Winds (1988)
 Wicked Jake Darcy (1989)
 One Touch of Topaz (1990)
 An Unexpected Song (1990)
 Tender Savage (1990)
 Winter Bride (1992)
 Star-Spangled Bride (1993)

Historical Romance 
 Last Bridge Home (1992)
 The Tiger Prince (January, 1993)
 The Magnificent Rogue (September, 1993)
 Midnight Warrior (August, 1994)
The Beloved Scoundrel (September, 1994)
 Dark Rider (May, 1995)

Sedikhan Series
List of series
 The Golden Barbarian (March, 1992)
 The Golden Valkyrie (1984)
 The Trustworthy Redhead (Louis Benoit) (1984)
 Capture the Rainbow (1984)
 Touch the Horizon (1984)
 A Summer Smile (1985)
 And the Desert Blooms (1986)
 Always (1986)
 Everlasting (1986)
 Til the End of Time (1987)
 Last Bridge Home (September, 1987)
 Across the River of Yesterday (1987)
 Starlight, Starbright (1988)
 Man From Half Moon Bay (1988)
 Blue Skies and Shining Promises (1988)
 Magnificent Folly (1989)
 Notorious (1990)
 A Tough Man to Tame (1991)

Delaney Series
List of series
 This Fierce Splendor (1988)
 Wild Silver (1988)
 Satin Ice (1988)
 The Delaney Christmas Carol (1992) w/ Kay Hooper

The Delaneys of Killaroo Series
List of series
 Matilda, the Adventuress (1987)

The Shamrock Trinity Series
List of series
 York, The Renegade (1986)

Lion's Bride Series
List of series
 Lion's Bride (February, 1996)
 The Treasure (December, 2008)

The Wind Dancer series
 The Wind Dancer (February, 1991)
 Storm Winds (June, 1991)
 Reap the Wind (October, 1991/a completely revised edition came out in 2002)
 Final Target (May, 2001)

Featuring Eve Duncan

The Face of Deception (October, 1998)
The Killing Game (September, 1999)
The Search (June, 2000)
Body of Lies (March, 2002)
Dead Aim (April, 2003)
Blind Alley (September, 2004)
Countdown  (May, 2005)
Stalemate (December, 2006)
Quicksand (April, 2008)
Blood Game (October, 2009)
Eight Days to Live (April, 2010)
Chasing the Night (October, 2010)
Eve (April, 2011)
Quinn (July, 2011)
Bonnie (October, 2011)
Sleep No More (October, 2012)
Taking Eve (April, 2013)
Hunting Eve (July, 2013)
Silencing Eve (October, 2013)
Shadow Play (September, 2015)
 Hide Away (April, 2016)
 Night and Day (July, 2016)
 Mind Game (October, 2017)
 Shattered Mirror (April, 2018)
 Dark Tribute (March, 2019)
 Smokescreen (July, 2019)
 The Persuasion (June, 2020)
 The Bullet (June 8, 2021)

Featuring Catherine Ling
 Chasing the Night (October, 2010)
 What Doesn't Kill You (April, 2012)
 Live to See Tomorrow (April, 2014)
 Your Next Breath (April, 2015)
 Vendetta (October, 2018)

Stand Alone Novels 
 The Ugly Duckling (May, 1996)
 Long After Midnight (March, 1997)
 And Then You Die... (January, 1998)
 No One to Trust (October, 2002)
 Fatal Tide (September, 2003)
 Firestorm (March, 2004)
 On The Run (December, 2005)
 Killer Dreams (May, 2006)
 Pandora's Daughter (October, 2007)
 Dark Summer (October, 2008)
 Deadlock (April, 2009)
 The Perfect Witness (September, 2014)
 No Easy Target (April, 2017)
 Chaos (September, 2020)

With Roy Johansen

Stand Alone
 Storm Cycle (July, 2009)

Featuring Hannah Bryson
 Silent Thunder (July, 2008)
 Shadow Zone (July, 2010)

Featuring Kendra Michaels
 With Open Eyes (June, 2012) [e-book short story]
 Close Your Eyes (July, 2012)
 Sight Unseen (July, 2014)
 The Naked Eye (July, 2015)
 Night Watch (October, 2016)
 Look Behind You (July, 2017)
 Double Blind (July, 2018)
 Hindsight (January, 2020)
 Blink of an Eye (February 2, 2021)

Awards
 1996 Romantic Times Historical Romance Winner
 1999 Romantic Times Suspense Winner
 2016 Romantic Times Career Achievement — Thriller Winner

Film Adaptation
In 2011, the second novel in Johansen's Eve Duncan series was made in to a Lifetime film adaptation, The Killing Game (2011 film), starring Laura Prepon as forensic sculptor Eve Duncan. This film adaptation was directed by Bobby Roth.

References

External links
Iris Johansen Official Website
 Iris Johansen's 47,000 square foot house in Cartersville, Ga. is listed for sale

1938 births
Living people
20th-century American novelists
21st-century American novelists
20th-century American women writers
21st-century American women writers
American crime fiction writers
American romantic fiction writers
American women novelists
Place of birth missing (living people)
Novelists from Georgia (U.S. state)
Women romantic fiction writers
Women crime fiction writers